"You'll Never Know" is a popular song written by Harry Warren from 1943.

You'll Never Know may also refer to:

 "You'll Never Know" (1927 song), 1989
 "You'll Never Know" (Kim Richey song), 1998
 "You'll Never Know", a song by Michael Learns to Rock from the album Played on Pepper, 1995
 "You'll Never Know", a song by Krystal Meyers from the album Make Some Noise, 2008
 "You'll Never Know", a song by Ariana Grande from the album Yours Truly, 2013

See also
 Never Know (disambiguation)
 You Never Know (disambiguation)